Lemuel Tukey (August 6, 1766 – July 22, 1835) was an American businessman from Portland, Maine. The city's Tukey's Bridge is named for him.  He ran a tavern on the Portland end of a previous version of the bridge, which was completed in 1796, and objected to the city's decision to end the collection of tolls, so he collected them anyway until he was forced to stop in the early 1830s.

In 1823, Tukey was registered as a distiller and a mountfort.

Personal life
Tukey was born on August 6, 1766, to John and Abigail (née Sweetsir) Tukey, one of their fourteen children, all born in Portland, Maine. William, one of his brothers, helped construct Portland Head Light.

He married first Sarah Snow, then her sister, Eunice. Tukey had at least one child, a daughter, Jane (c. 1808 – 1869). She named one of her children after her father. Lemuel Tukey Jr. (1839 – 1865) died, aged 26, shortly after fighting in — and being taken captive during — the Battle of the Wilderness.

References 

1766 births
1835 deaths
Businesspeople from Portland, Maine
People from Portland, Maine